Calocoris roseomaculatus is a species of bugs in the Mirinae subfamily of the Miridae family. It is found in Europe.

Subspecies
Two subspecies are recognized:
Calocoris roseomaculatus angularis (Fieber, 1864) 
Calocoris roseomaculatus roseomaculatus (De Geer, 1773)

Description
This true bug shows distinctive rosy or reddish markings on the whitish forewings and a black longitudinal line on the scutellum. Adults can be found from June until October.

Both adults and larve feed on various Asteraceae and Fabaceae, mainly Lotus formosissimus, Ononis repens and Anthyllis vulneraria.

Distribution
This species is present in most of Europe.

Habitat
Calocoris roseomaculatus lives in dry grasslands.

References

Mirini
Hemiptera of Europe
Insects described in 1773
Taxa named by Charles De Geer